Joseph Costa may refer to:
Joseph Costa (soccer) (born 1992), Australian footballer
Joseph Costa (photographer) (1904–1988), American newspaper photographer
Joseph Costa (aviator) (1909–1998), Luso-American aviator
Joseph Desler Costa (born 1980), photographer and musician

See also
Joseph da Costa (1683–1753), English merchant